Jkvr. Jacoba Berendina van Heemskerck van Beest (1876-1923) was a Dutch painter, stained glass designer and graphic artist who worked in several modern genres. She specialized in abstract landscapes and still-lifes.

Biography
Her father, Jacob Eduard van Heemskerck van Beest, was an officer in the Royal Netherlands Navy who also painted seascapes and landscapes. Her first art lessons came from him. She later took private lessons from two local artists before attending classes at the Royal Academy of Art from 1897 to 1901, where she studied with Ferdinand Hart Nibbrig.

Her first contact with modern art came in Paris, where she took lessons from Eugène Carrière. She remained in France until 1904, then went to live with her sister, Lucie, and was introduced to the art collector, Marie Tak van Poortvliet, who became her lifelong friend and later built a studio for her in the garden of her home. After 1906, she spent her Summers in Domburg, where she came into contact with avant-garde painters such as Piet Mondriaan and Jan Toorop, who offered her advice. Around 1911, she was briefly interested in Cubism.

Shortly after, she became involved in Anthroposophy, possibly through the influence of her former teacher, Nibbrig, who was a Theosophist. She then became an avid follower of Der Sturm, an avant-garde art magazine founded by Herwarth Walden, and turned increasingly to Abstraction. In 1913, she attended the Erster Deutscher Herbstsalon in Berlin, where she met Walden and started what would be a lifelong correspondence. Thanks to his efforts, her work was popular in Germany, while it remained somewhat ignored in her home country.

After 1916, she developed an interest in stained glass windows, designing them for the naval barracks and the Municipal Health Department building in Amsterdam, as well as private residences. From 1922, she lived in Domburg with her old friend and patron, Tak van Poortvliet.

She died suddenly, from an attack of angina. Both Tak van Poortvliet and Walden mounted exhibitions of her work, in Amsterdam and Berlin respectively. In 2005, a major retrospective was held at the Gemeentemuseum Den Haag.

Selected works

Notes

References

Further reading
A. H. Huussen and Jacqueline van Paaschen-Louwerse, Jacoba van Heemskerck, schilderes uit roeping. Waanders, 2005 
Jacoba van Heemskerck. Truly Modern, Hirmer Publishers, Munich 2021, ISBN 978-3-7774-3699-9

External links

 Jacoba van Heemskerck van Beest, National Gallery of Art, Washington, DC
ArtNet: More works by Van Heemskerck.
 Jacoba van Heemskerck, in the RKD Archive, The Hague, only in Dutch language
 ' Jacoba van Heemskerck - A Rediscovery; exhibition-text  of the Gemeentemuseum The Hague, August - Nov. 2005
 23 images of her art-works - on Wikiart
 images of four wood-cuts - in the collection of the MoMA

1876 births
1923 deaths
Dutch women painters
Dutch glass artists
Women glass artists
Jonkvrouws of the Netherlands
Artists from The Hague
20th-century Dutch painters
20th-century Dutch women artists
Deaths from arteriosclerosis